The 2019–20 Oregon State Beavers women's basketball team represents Oregon State University during the 2019–20 NCAA Division I women's basketball season. The Beavers, led by tenth year head coach Scott Rueck, play their games at the Gill Coliseum and are members of the Pac-12 Conference.

Roster

Schedule

|-
!colspan=9 style=| Exhibition

|-
!colspan=9 style=| Non-conference regular season

|-
!colspan=9 style=| Pac-12 regular season

|-
!colspan=9 style=|Pac-12 Women's Tournament

Rankings
2019–20 NCAA Division I women's basketball rankings

^Coaches did not release a Week 2 poll

See also
2019–20 Oregon State Beavers men's basketball team

References

Oregon State Beavers women's basketball seasons
Oregon State
Oregon State Beavers women's basketball
Oregon State Beavers women's basketball